The Sansculottides (also Epagomènes) are holidays following the last month of the year on the French Republican calendar which was used following the French Revolution from approximately 1793 to 1805. 
 
The Sansculottides, named after the sans-culottes, append the twelve, 30-day months of the Republican Calendar with five complementary days in a common year or six complementary days in a leap year, so that the calendar year would approximately match the tropical year. They follow the last day of Fructidor, the last month of the year, and precede the first day of Vendémiaire. 

Each of the Sansculottides were assigned as one of the ten days of the week. Even though the five or six days were less than a full week, the following 1 Vendémiaire would still be a primidi, skipping four or five days of the week. The Sansculottides belong to the summer quarter. They begin on 17 or 18 September and approximately end on the autumn equinox, on 22 or 23 September on the Gregorian calendar.

History 

In the decree of 5 October 1793 (le 14 du 1er mois de l'an II; later: le 14 Vendémiaire de l'an II) by the National Convention, the days following the last month of the year were named jours complémentaires and numbered serially. Only the leap day (jour intercalaire) received a name:

1. premier jour complémentaire — First Complementary Day
2. second jour complémentaire — Second Complementary Day
3. troisième jour complémentaire — Third Complementary Day
4. quatrième jour complémentaire — Fourth Complementary Day
5. cinquième jour complémentaire — Fifth Complementary Day
6. jour de la Révolution — Revolution Day

The other days, decades, and months were also serially numbered. 

On 24 October (le 3 du 2e mois; later: le 3 Brumaire) of the same year, the poet Philippe-François-Nazaire Fabre, known as Fabre d'Églantine, made public his dislike of this naming convention ("le premier jour de la première décade du premier mois de la première année"). He suggested proper names for the months, the days of the months, and the days of the decades. For the jours complémentaires, he introduced the name Sansculottides. The individual days should have the following names:

1. fête du génie — Celebration of Talent
2. fête du travail — Celebration of Labour
3. fête des actions — Celebration of Policy
4. fête des récompenses — Celebration of Honors
5. fête de l’opinion — Celebration of Convictions
6. la Sans-culottide / la Sanculottide — (rough meaning:) "Day of the Revolutionary"

According to the proposal by Fabre d'Églantine:
The fête du génie should be dedicated to the most precious and, for the nation, most useful achievements of the human mind accomplished in the past year.

The fête du travail should be focused on industry, physical labour, and production of useful things.

On the fête des actions, good and beneficial policies should be praised that have been helpful, even if only of benefit to individuals rather than to the nation.

On the fête des récompenses, people should be rewarded for the merits exemplifying the previous three days' mottos.

On the fête de l’opinion, people should criticise the administration, without fear of punishment, in the form of songs, caricatures, and ironic and sarcastic speeches. By this, d'Églantine meant: "I dare to say that this one day will cause public servants to do their duty more than even the laws of a Draco ever could."

The Sanculottide, celebrated in leap years, should be the celebration of national unity. Representatives from all parts of the country should meet each other in the capital and celebrate together.

On 24 November 1793 these proposals were accepted with slight modifications. It was decided that the name should be written fêtes Sansculotides (one 't'). The alternate spellings Sans-culotides and Sans-culottides were also used. The fête des actions was shifted to the first place and named fête de la vertu. The fête des récompenses went to the last place and the leap year day regained its old name:

1. fête de la vertu — Celebration of Virtue
2. fête du génie — Celebration of Talent
3. fête du travail — Celebration of Labour
4. fête de l’opinion — Celebration of Convictions
5. fête des récompenses — Celebration of Honors
6. fête de la Révolution — Celebration of the Revolution

On 24 August 1795 (le 7 Fructidor de l'an III), the Sansculottides were renamed again to jours complémentaires (Complementary Days). The fête du travail was also known as the fête du labour. The fête de l'opinion was also termed fête de l'option (Celebration of Choice) or fête de la raison (Celebration of Reason).

The Basque translation of the calendar for 1799 simply names the bethagail-egunak as bethagail-legun, bethagail-bigun,... ("complementary primidi", "complementary duodi",...).

Conversion table

References

External links

Summer Quarter of Year II (facsimile)
Decree concerning the Republican Calendar, October 5, 1793 (facsimile)
Fabre d’Églantine: Rapport sur le calendrier révolutionnaire (French)

French Republican calendar